Richard Ernest Woodard (July 26, 1926 – August 24, 2019) was an American football center in the National Football League for the New York Giants and Washington Redskins.  Woodard also played in the All-America Football Conference for the Los Angeles Dons.

Woodward was born in Britt, Iowa. He played college football at the University of Iowa and was drafted in the 21st round of the 1948 NFL Draft by the Giants. In 1948, Woodard was an honorable mention selection for the All-Big Nine team. He died on August 24, 2019, at the age of 93.

References

External links
 

1926 births
2019 deaths
People from Britt, Iowa
Military personnel from Iowa
Players of American football from Iowa
American football centers
Iowa Hawkeyes football players
Los Angeles Dons players
New York Giants players
Washington Redskins players